This page is a list of the main career statistics of French tennis player, Richard Gasquet. To date, he has won 16 ATP singles titles. He was also the runner-up at the 2005 Hamburg Masters and Canada Masters in 2006 and 2012, a semifinalist at the 2007 and 2015 Wimbledon Championships and 2013 US Open and a bronze medallist in men's doubles with Julien Benneteau at the 2012 London Olympics. On 9 July 2007, Gasquet achieved a career high singles ranking of world No. 7.

Significant finals

Grand Slam tournaments

Mixed doubles: 1 (1 title)

Olympic games

Doubles: 1 (1 bronze medal)

Masters 1000 tournaments

Singles: 3 (3 runner-ups)

Doubles: 1 (1 runner-up)

ATP Tour career finals

Singles: 33 (16 titles, 17 runner-ups)

Doubles: 4 (2 titles, 2 runner-ups)

National representation

Team competition finals: 5 (2 titles, 3 runner-ups)

Singles performance timeline

Current through the 2023 Indian Wells Masters.

1Held as Hamburg Masters until 2008, Madrid Masters (clay) 2009–present.
2Held as Madrid Masters (hardcourt) until 2008, and Shanghai Masters 2009–present.

*Gasquet withdrew from the 2007 US Open due to illness, having won his opening round.

Record against top 10 players

Record against top 10 players

Gasquet's record against players who have been ranked in the top 10, with those who are active in boldface. Only ATP Tour main draw matches are considered:

Top 10 wins
 He has a  win-loss record against players who were, at the time the match was played, ranked in the top 10.

ATP career earnings

* Statistics correct .

References

External links
 
 
 

Tennis career statistics